DeForest Wheeler Trimingham (23 December 1919 – 30 March 2007) was a Bermudian sailor. He competed in the Flying Dutchman event at the 1960 Summer Olympics.

References

External links
 

1919 births
2007 deaths
Bermudian male sailors (sport)
Olympic sailors of Bermuda
Sailors at the 1960 Summer Olympics – Flying Dutchman
People from Paget Parish